George Kunda (26 February 1956 – 16 April 2012) was a Zambian lawyer and politician who was the 11th vice-president of Zambia from 2008 to 2011.  He served under President Rupiah Banda until their party's loss to Michael Sata's party.

Early life and career
The son of a miner, Kunda studied at Serenje Boys Technical School and obtained a law degree from the University of Zambia and began practicing on April 28, 1982. He started his career at the Luanshya Municipal Council as a solicitor before creating his own law firm in 1990.

Politics
While Kunda did not compete in the 2001 parliamentary election, he gained one of the eight appointed seats in Parliament. President Levy Mwanawasa appointed him to the positions of Minister of Justice and Attorney General in 2002. However, Mwanawasa removed Kunda from the position of Attorney General and appointed Mumba Malila in 2006 while leaving Kunda with his position of Justice Minister.

Vice president
From 2008 to September 2011, Kunda served as vice president during Rupiah Banda's presidency. At a mining conference in June 2011, Kunda stated that Zambia was interested in expanding their mining resources, such as iron ore and uranium.

Homosexuality
In May 2010, Kunda claimed that homosexuality could lead to "sadism and Satanism". Kunda brought up the topic of homosexuality in the months leading to the 2011 elections as a "wedge issue" by addressing the Parliament of Zambia on 18 March 2011 and highlighted that homosexuality in Zambia is illegal and punishable in the Zambian law.

Death
On 16 April 2012, Kunda died of a kidney failure. He was buried at Leopards Hill Memorial Park in Lusaka on 20 April 2012.

References

1956 births
2012 deaths
20th-century Zambian lawyers
Vice-presidents of Zambia
Justice Ministers of Zambia
Members of the National Assembly of Zambia
Movement for Multi-Party Democracy politicians
People from Luanshya
Attorneys-General of Zambia
University of Zambia alumni
21st-century Zambian lawyers